The Red House is a 1972 thriller novel by the British writer Derek Lambert. A leading Soviet diplomat defects to the West.

References

Bibliography
 Burton, Alan. Historical Dictionary of British Spy Fiction. Rowman & Littlefield, 2016.

1972 British novels
Novels by Derek Lambert
British thriller novels
Michael Joseph books